Renée French (born 1963) is an American comics writer and illustrator and, under the pen name Rainy Dohaney, a children's book author, and exhibiting artist.

Her work is characterized by her "obsessive-looking and highly unsettling visual style."

Books
Her work includes H Day (Picturebox), The Soap Lady (inspired by the display in the Mütter Museum) (Top Shelf Productions), The Ticking (Top Shelf Productions), and Micrographica (Top Shelf Productions), Edison Steelhead's Lost Portfolio: Exploratory Studies of Girls and Rabbits (Sparkplug Books), and Marbles in My Underpants (Oni Press).  She also has a weekly strip The Taint in the New York Press. Her serialized comic Baby Bjornstrand appears on the Study Group Comic Books website.  The New York Times said her graphic novels "split the difference between adorable and horrifically gross"; writing about "Baby Bjornstrand", they called it "equal parts Daffy Duck and Samuel Beckett, and all quirky Renée French".

French has a serialized illustrated story in the Fantagraphics Books quarterly Mome called "Almost Sound". She is also the author of the comic book for children, Barry's Best Buddy, released by Toon Books in 2013.

Artistic influences 
As a child, French found a book plate of Hieronymus Bosch's The Garden of Earthly Delights and was enchanted by it. In regards to the influence, French stated "I don't know how many hours I stared at it under the covers, but I'd memorised each little scene within the paintings and thought about them all the time. That world was so real to me."

French suffers from migraines, which she uses to her creative advantage, as detailed in her interview with WOW x WOW. Her book, H Day, is "an attempt to show what it's like to have a migraine, from the outside and the inside." According to French, "most of the portraits with things exploding out of the face or the skin warping around the head, are based on the migraines."

Mascots

French drew both the mascot of the Plan 9 from Bell Labs operating system ("Glenda", aka "the Plan 9 Bunny"), and the gopher mascot for the Go programming language.

Personal life
French grew up in New Jersey, and was always drawing as a child. French is married to  Rob Pike, one of the creators of Plan 9 from Bell Labs, and of the Go programming language at Google. They split their time between the United States and Australia.

Awards
In 2007, French was nominated for a number of comics industry awards - including for best artist nods from the Eisner, Ignatz, and Harvey Awards - for the graphic novel The Ticking.  French won the Inkpot Award at the 2007 San Diego Comic Con.

Bibliography

Select comics works 
Hagelbarger and That Nightmare Goat (Yam Books), 2013. 
 Barry's Best Buddy (Toon Books) 2013
 Bjornstrand (PictureBox) September 2012
 Baby Bjornstrand (Koyama Press) September 2014
 H Day (PictureBox) 2010
 Micrographica (Top Shelf Productions) 2007
 The Ticking (Top Shelf Productions) 2006
 Marbles in my Underpants (Oni Press)
 The Soap Lady  (Top Shelf Productions)
 The Adventures of Rheumy Peepers & Chunky Highlights  (Oni Press)
 Grit Bath (Fantagraphics)
 Edison Steelhead's Lost Portfolio: Exploratory Studies of Girls and Rabbits (Sparkplug Books)  June 2007.

Children's books (as Rainy Dohaney) 
 My Best Sweet Potato (Atheneum Books) 2006
 Tinka (Atheneum Books) 2005

Footnotes

References 
Renée French Instagram
Renée French drawing blog
Renée French official site
Interview with Renée French
The Comics Journal interview with Renée French 
WOW x WOW interview with Renée French

American comics writers
Alternative cartoonists
Underground cartoonists
American female comics artists
Female comics writers
1963 births
Living people
Inkpot Award winners